Altica (New Latin from Greek , haltikós, "jumper" or "jumping") is a large genus of flea beetles in the subfamily Galerucinae, with about 300 species, distributed nearly worldwide. The genus is best represented in the Neotropical realm, well represented in the Nearctic and Palearctic, but occurs also in the Afrotropic, Indomalaya, and Australasia. The species are similar to each other, small metallic blue-green-bronze beetles, often distinguished from each other only by the aedeagus. The species of Altica, both as larvae and as adults, are phytophagous, feeding on plant foliage of various food plant taxa, specific for each Altica species. Onagraceae and Rosaceae (mainly Rubus) are the dominant host plant families for Holarctic species. The adult Altica beetles are able to jump away when approached.

Selected species

References

Further reading

Král J. (1964–1979). Zur Kenntnis der palaearktischen Altica-Arten. Part 1–7. Entomologische Blätter 60: 126–133, 162–166; 62: 53–61, 159–168; 65: 72–85; 72: 61–63; 75: 98–108.
LeSage, L. 1995. Revision of the costate species of Altica Müller from North America north of Mexico. Canadian Entomologist 127, 295–411.
Plague and government response for the Altica quercetorum plague in Galicia.

Alticini
Chrysomelidae genera
Taxa named by Étienne Louis Geoffroy